Nicolaas Marcus "Nico" van der Voet (born 13 March 1944 in Wassenaar) is a former water polo player from the Netherlands, who competed in two Summer Olympics for his native country. In 1964 he finished in eighth position with the Dutch Men's Team. Four years later in Mexico City he became seventh with the Holland squad.

See also
 Netherlands men's Olympic water polo team records and statistics
 List of men's Olympic water polo tournament top goalscorers

External links
 

1944 births
Living people
Dutch male water polo players
Olympic water polo players of the Netherlands
Water polo players at the 1964 Summer Olympics
Water polo players at the 1968 Summer Olympics
People from Wassenaar
Sportspeople from South Holland
20th-century Dutch people